The Women's 200 metre backstroke competition of the 2019 African Games was held on 21 August 2019.

Records
Prior to the competition, the existing world and championship records were as follows.

Results

Final

The final was started on 21 August at 17:00.

References

Women's 200 metre backstroke
2019 in women's swimming